Jean Van de Velde may refer to:

Jean van de Velde (director) (born 1957), Dutch film director and screenwriter
Jean van de Velde (golfer) (born 1966), French professional golfer